Wudang Rules (literally "Wudang Worship") is a 2015 Hong Kong martial arts, action themed television drama created and produced by TVB, starring  Chin Siu-ho, Tavia Yeung, Yuen Qiu, Timmy Hung, Derek Kok and Toby Leung as the main cast. Filming took place from August until October 2014. The drama  began airing on Hong Kong's Jade and HD Jade channels from May 25 until June 19, 2015 every Monday through Friday during its 8:30-9:30 pm timeslot with a total of 20 episodes.

Wudang Rules is Chin Siu-ho's first drama with TVB in twenty years. He last starred in TVB's 1996 drama (俠義見青天).

Synopsis
After a set-back in life, former Hong Kong undercover detective Pau Kai-chung (Chin Siu-ho) heads to the Wudang Mountains in Hubei, China to get away from life. At Wudang he re-connects with his former martial arts senior Mo Yee-shan (Yuen Qiu), who now operates an inn and martial arts school in the Wudang Mountains. She also takes in a mentally retarded man named Ho Ching-tung (Derek Kok) with a mysterious past. Kai-chung takes up a job as a chef at Yee-shan's inn.

Originally known for being a land of spiritual calmness, Wudang enters a state of chaos after a group of new tai chi students from Hong Kong are taken in. The new students include the fighter Cheung Ka-kong (Timmy Hung), son of a wealthy businessman Lok Yik-hin (Jonathan Cheung), personal female bodyguard Yeung Ching-wu (Toby Leung), model Siu Yuk (Regen Cheung) and behind came Yee Shan's daughter Lok Yeung (Tavia Yeung).

The appearance of Lok Yeung triggers a painful memory in Kai Chung. Lok Yeung's purpose in staying in Wudang is to convince her mother to give her lodging establishment to a Hong Kong investment group so as to gain credit for herself. After a series of incidents, Yee Shan promises to give up the establishment if Lok Yeung manages to win a competition in three months. Meanwhile, Yee Shan purposely injures herself so Kai Chung can teach her tai chi class.
Eventually, Ching Tung overcomes his mental illness and becomes well again. He exposes Kai Chung's true identity, and danger shrouds the Wudang Mountains.

Cast

Main cast
Chin Siu-ho as Pau Kai-chung (包繼沖)
Tavia Yeung as Lok Yeung, Ocean (樂　洋), Yee-shan's daughter
Yuen Qiu as Mo Yee-shan (毛倚珊), Ocean's mother
Timmy Hung as Cheung Ka-kong, Ken (張家港), Kung fu obsession
Derek Kok as Ho Ching-tung (何正東) /（番薯）during memory loss
Toby Leung as Yeung Ching-wu (楊晴瑚), Chinese name pronounce as Yang Cheng Hu, a place that is famous for its hairy crabs; so, her nickname is Hai Mui (Crab-Girl); Yik-hin's bodyguard
Jonathan Cheung as Law Yik-hin, Charles (羅亦軒), wealthy playboy; Hai mui protection target

Extended cast
Stanley Cheung as Cheung Ka-chun (張家川)
Kirby Lam  as Mo Gwaa (毛　瓜)
Mandy Ho as Mo Dau (毛　荳)
Rainky Wai as Mia Lau (劉星語; lau sing jyu)
Regen Cheung as Siu Yuk (蕭　鈺), Model/Singer named 'Shangri-La' 
Lee Yee-man as Man Yee-lei (文綺莉)
Yoyo Chen as Ho Ching-lam (何靖嵐)
Akina Hong as Sek Lam (石　琳)
Jason Chan as Wah Yi-gai (華以楷)
Rosanne Lui as Chin Yam-yam (錢鑫鑫), Siu Yuk's mother and manager
Hinson Chou as Chiu Yuan-coeng (趙元暢)
Carat Cheung as Diana Dai (戴安娜; daai on naa)
Helen Ng as Dan Lai-chu (單麗珠)
Teresa Ha Ping as Pretty elder lady Tong (唐靚姑; tong leng gu)
Pauline Chow as Ma Chun-wai (馬臻蕙)
Lily Poon as Kuk Man-ting (曲文靜)
Otto Chan as Zin Lun (賤　侖)
Kong Fu-keung as Wong Gin-bong (王建邦)
Winston Tsang as Man Kin (文　乾)
Kong Wing-fai as Yeung Seung-ci (楊尚施)
Chan Wing-chun as Lau Fok-wing (劉福榮)
Ceci So as Fan Chu-heung (樊朝香)
Henry Lo as Cheung Hoi-ho (張凱厚)
King Kong Lam as Dai Gwan (大　軍)
Alan Tam Kwan-lun as Mo Kwan (武　坤)
Mak Ka-lun as Wilson
Russell Cheung as Chung (昌)
Albert Law as Lok Fu (樂　賦)
Barry Cox
Ivana Wong (王舒銳) as cosplay model (模特兒)
Virginia Lau as cosplay model (模特兒)

Parody cast and main characters
Yugo as Lok Yeung <Ocean> (乐洋)
Futo as Ho Ching-lam (何靖岚)

Development
This drama marked Derek Kok's last performance for TVB.
Sisley Choi was originally cast for the role of Mia Lau. However, due to a schedule conflict of filming Young Charioteers, Rainky Wai replaced her.
The costume fitting ceremony was held on August 13, 2014, at 12:30 pm Tseung Kwan O TVB City Studio One.
Filming at the Wudang Mountains took place in October 2014. 
Filming of the drama began in August 2014 and ended in October 2014.
Wudang Rules was one of the dramas previewed at "TVB Sales Presentation 2015" held in November 2014.

Viewership Ratings

Awards and nominations

International Broadcast
  - 8TV (Malaysia), TV2 (Malaysia)

References

External links
Official website 

TVB dramas
2015 Hong Kong television series debuts
2015 Hong Kong television series endings
Television shows set in Hubei